Margot Lovejoy (21 October 1930 – 1 August 2019) was a digital artist and historian of art and technology. She was Professor Emerita of Visual Arts at the State University of New York at Purchase. She was the author of Digital Currents: Art in the Electronic Age. Lovejoy was recipient of a 1987 Guggenheim Fellowship and a 1994 Arts International Grant in India.

Digital Currents
In her best known historic work, Digital Currents: Art in the Electronic Age, Lovejoy followed on the research of Frank Popper, Jack Burnham and Gene Youngblood by documenting the historical record of the relationship between technology and art as culminating in digital art. Lovejoy recounted the early histories of electronic media for art making (video, computer art, the Internet) by providing a context for the works of major artists in each media, describing their projects, and discussing the issues and theoretical implications of each to create a foundation for understanding this developing field of digital art.

In Digital Currents she explored the growing impact of digital technologies on aesthetic experience and examined the major changes taking place in the role of the artist as social communicator. She demonstrated that just as the rise of photographic techniques in the mid-19th century shattered traditional views about representation, so too have contemporary electronic tools catalyzed new perspectives on art, affecting the way artists see, think, and work, and the ways in which their productions are distributed and communicated.

Websites
Her website Parthenia was archived by the Walker Art Center as part adaweb.com and her website TURNS was featured in the 2002 Whitney Museum Biennial. Her work is in the collection of the National Museum of Women in the Arts

Publications
Digital Currents: Art in the Electronic Age
Postmodern Currents: Art and Artists in the Age of Electronic Media
Labyrinth (1991)
The Book of Plagues (1995)
Paradoxic mutations
Manifestations

Awards
1987: Guggenheim Fellowship
1994: Arts International Grant, India

Solo exhibitions
Alternative Museum, New York
P.S.#1 Contemporary Art Center, New York
Newhouse Center for Contemporary Art, New York
Queens Museum of Art, New York
Neuberger Museum of Art, New York
Stamford Museum, New York
Islip Museum, New York

References

 Christiane Paul, Digital Art, Thames & Hudson, London, p. 219

American art critics
American art historians
1930 births
2019 deaths
Postmodernists
Cultural historians
State University of New York at Purchase faculty
American digital artists
Women digital artists
Postmodern artists
Artists from New York (state)
New media artists
American installation artists
Mass media theorists
American women historians
Women art historians
21st-century American women artists